NG2 (or Ng2) may refer to:

 Neuron-glial antigen 2, a chondroitin sulfate proteoglycan that in humans is encoded by the CSPG4 gene
 Ninja Gaiden II, a 2008 video game
 Ng2 business park, a business park in the city of Nottingham, England
 NG2 tram stop, a tram stop in the city of Nottingham, England
 NG2 (duo), a Puerto Rican Salsa duo